Events from the year 1943 in Michigan.

Top stories
The Associated Press polled editors of its member newspapers in Michigan and ranked the state's top news stories of 1943 as follows:
 1943 Detroit race riot (278 points)
 Judge Leland Carr's one-man grand jury investigation of the Michigan Legislature (185 points)
 The May 26 death of Edsel Ford at age 49 (168-1/2 points)
 Court-martial of William T. Colman, following the shooting of an African-American private by the commandant of Selfridge field (143-1/2 points)
 President Roosevelt's July commutation of the death sentence for treason given to German-born Detroit tavernkeeper Max Stephan (130 points)
 Tom Harmon's survival of plane crashes in South American and China (118 points)
 The FBI arrests of seven in connection with a Detroit spy ring (100 points)
 Republican policy conference on Mackinac Island (60 points)
 Automotive arms output totaled $10 billion (49 points)
 Re-election of Edward Jeffries as mayor of Detroit (48 points)

Office holders

State office holders

 Governor of Michigan: Harry Kelly (Republican)
 Lieutenant Governor of Michigan: Eugene C. Keyes (Republican) 
 Michigan Attorney General: Herbert J. Rushton (Republican)
 Michigan Secretary of State: Herman H. Dignan (Republican)
 Speaker of the Michigan House of Representatives: Howard Nugent (Republican)
 Chief Justice, Michigan Supreme Court:

Mayors of major cities
 Mayor of Detroit: Edward Jeffries (Republican)
 Mayor of Grand Rapids: George W. Welsh (Republican)
 Mayor of Flint: William Osmund Kelly
 Mayor of Lansing: Ralph Crego
 Mayor of Saginaw: William J. Brydges/Eric F. Wieneke

Federal office holders
 U.S. Senator from Michigan: Homer S. Ferguson (Republican)
 U.S. Senator from Michigan: Arthur Vandenberg (Republican) 
 House District 1: Rudolph G. Tenerowicz (Democrat)/George G. Sadowski (Democrat)
 House District 2: Earl C. Michener (Republican)
 House District 3: Paul W. Shafer (Republican)
 House District 4: Clare Hoffman (Republican)
 House District 5: Bartel J. Jonkman (Republican)
 House District 6: William W. Blackney (Republican)
 House District 7: Jesse P. Wolcott (Republican)
 House District 8: Fred L. Crawford (Republican)
 House District 9: Albert J. Engel (Republican)
 House District 10: Roy O. Woodruff (Republican)
 House District 11: Frederick Van Ness Bradley (Republican)
 House District 12: John B. Bennett (Republican)
 House District 13: George D. O'Brien (Democrat)
 House District 14: Louis C. Rabaut (Democrat)
 House District 15: John D. Dingell Sr. (Democrat)
 House District 16: John Lesinski Sr. (Democrat)
 House District 17: George Anthony Dondero (Republican)

Population

Companies
The following is a list of major companies based in Michigan in 1943.

Sports

Baseball
 1943 Detroit Tigers season – The Tigers compiled a 78–76 record and finished in fifth place in the American League. The team's statistical leaders included Dick Wakefield with a .316 batting average, Rudy York with 34 home runs and 118 RBIs, Dizzy Trout with 20 wins, and Tommy Bridges with a 2.39 earned run average.
 1943 Michigan Wolverines baseball season - Under head coach Ray Fisher, the Wolverines compiled an 8–4 record. Don Robinson was the team captain.

American football
 1943 Detroit Lions season – Under head coach Gus Dorais, the Lions compiled a 3–6–1 record. The team's statistical leaders included Frankie Sinkwich with 699 passing yards and 266 rushing yards and Harry Hopp with 54 points scored. 
 1943 Michigan Wolverines football team – Under head coach Fritz Crisler, the Wolverines compiled an 8–1 record, tied with Purdue for the Big Ten Conference championship, and were ranked No. 3 in the final AP Poll. Fullback Bill Daley finished seventh in the voting for the Heisman Trophy and was selected as a consensus All-American.
 1943 Central Michigan Chippewas football team - Under head coach Ron Finch, the Chippewas compiled a 2–3 record, were shut out in all three losses, and were outscored by all opponents by a combined total of 69 to 20.
 1943 Michigan State Normal Hurons football team - Under head coach Elton Rynearson, the Hurons compiled an undefeated record of 2–0, playing two games against Wayne State and winning both games by identical 14–0 scores.
 1943 Western Michigan Broncos football team - Under head coach John Gill, the Broncos compiled a 4–2 record and outscored their opponents, 151 to 89.

Basketball
 1942–43 Michigan Wolverines men's basketball team – Under head coach Bennie Oosterbaan, the Wolverines compiled a 10–8 record.
 1942–43 Western Michigan Broncos men's basketball team – Under head coach Buck Read, the Broncos compiled a 15-4 record.
 1942–43 Detroit Titans men's basketball team – Under head coach Lloyd Brazil, the Titans compiled a 15-5 record.

Ice hockey
 1942–43 Detroit Red Wings season –  Under head coach Jack Adams, the Red Wings compiled a 25-14-11 record, finished first in the NHL, and defeated the Boston Bruins, four games to zero, in the 1943 Stanley Cup Finals. Sid Abel was the team captain, and the team's statistical leaders included Mud Bruneteau with 23 goals and Syd Howe with 35 assists and 55 points. Johnny Mowers was the goaltender.
 1942–43 Michigan Wolverines men's ice hockey team –  The team compiled a 1–10–2 record under coach Ed Lowrey.
 1942–43 Michigan Tech Huskies men's ice hockey team –  The team compiled a 1–9 record under coach Elwin Romnes.

Other

Chronology of events
 April 1–8 - The 1943 Stanley Cup Finals took place in Detroit and Boston. The Red Wings won the series, four games to zero.
 June 20–22 - The Detroit race riot of 1943 took place. The rioting began among youths at Belle Isle Park on June 20, 1943; the unrest moved into the city and was exacerbated by false rumors of racial attacks in both the black and white communities. It continued until June 22. It was suppressed after 6,000 federal troops were ordered into the city to restore peace. A total of 34 people were killed, 25 of them black and most at the hands of white police or National Guardsmen; 433 were wounded, 75 percent of them black; and property valued at $2 million ($27.5 million in 2015 US dollars) was destroyed, most of it in the black area of Paradise Valley, the poorest neighborhood of the city.

Births
 January 15 - Mike Marshall, Major League Baseball pitcher (1967–1981) and 1974 Cy Young Award winner, in Adrian, Michigan
 February 5 - Craig Morton, NFL quarterback (1965–1982) and AFC Offensive Player of the Year (1977), in Flint
 February 9 - Barbara Lewis, singer ("Hello Stranger", "Baby I'm Yours"), in Salem, Michigan
 February 16 - Iris Gordy, music songwriter and producer who helped launch the careers of DeBarge, Teena Marie, and Rick James, in Detroit
 March 10 - Bruce Joel Rubin, Academy Award winning screenwriter (Ghost), in Detroit
 March 11 - Peter Karmanos Jr., majority owner and chief executive officer of the Carolina Hurricanes of the NHL, in Detroit
 April 5 - Max Gail, actor (Detective Wojciehowicz on Barney Miller), in Detroit
 May 13 - Mary Wells, singer who helped to define the emerging sound of Motown in the early 1960s, in Detroit
 June - Barbara Martin, one of the original members of The Supremes, in Detroit
 June 6 - Merv Rettenmund, Major League Baseball outfielder (1968–1980), in Flint
 June 30 - Florence Ballard, founding member of the Motown vocal group The Supremes, in Detroit
 July 4 - Annette Beard, R&B and soul singer best known as an original member of the singing group Martha and the Vandellas, in Detroit
 July 18 - Calvin Peete, professional golfer, in Detroit
 August 2 - Max Wright, actor, best known for his role as Willie Tanner on the sitcom ALF, in Detroit
 August 9 - Wanda Young, member and co-lead singer of the Motown singing group The Marvelettes, in Inkster, Michigan
 September 2 - Rosalind Ashford, soprano R&B and soul singer, an original member of the Motown singing group Martha and the Vandellas, in Detroit
 September 21 - Jerry Bruckheimer, film and television producer (Beverly Hills Cop, Flashdance, Top Gun, Armageddon, Black Hawk Down, Pirates of the Caribbean film series), in Detroit
 December 26 - Fleming Williams, singer known as a member of the group The Hues Corporation and as the lead singer on their hit "Rock the Boat", in Flint

Deaths
 January 10 - 
 George A. Schroeder, former Speaker of the Michigan House of Representatives, at age 48 in Detroit
 Charles J. DeLand, Michigan Secretary of State (1921-1926), at age 63 in Detroit
 January 15 - Gustave Ferbert, player and head coach of the Michigan Wolverines football team (1893-1899) who left Ann Arbor for the Klondike Gold Rush, at age 69 in Cleveland
 April 22 - Luren Dickinson, anti-liquor crusader and Governor of Michigan (1939-1941), at age 84 in Charlotte, Michigan
 March 16 - Paul Bunker, Alpena native, All-American football player at West Point, and career Army officer who died as a Japanese POW, at age 61 in Formosa
 May 3 - Harry Miller, race car designer, his "Miller Specials" won the Indianapolis 500 11 times, at age 67 in Detroit
 May 7 - Bill Coughlin, third baseman for the Washington Senators (1901–1904) and Detroit Tigers (1904–1908), at age 64 in Scranton, Pennsylvania
 May 26 - Edsel Ford, President of Ford Motor Co. (1919-1943), at age 49 in Grosse Pointe Shores, Michigan
 August 16 - Albert Benbrook, All-American lineman at Michigan (1909-1910), at age 55 in Dallas
 December 14 - John Harvey Kellogg,  medical doctor who ran a sanitarium with a particular focus on nutrition, enemas, and exercise, best known for the invention of corn flakes, at age 91 in Battle Creek, Michigan

See also
 History of Michigan
 History of Detroit

References